Nupserha rufulipennis is a species of beetle in the family Cerambycidae. It was described by Stephan von Breuning in 1963.

Its type locality is the Rwenzori Mountains in Uganda.

References

rufulipennis
Beetles described in 1963
Taxa named by Stephan von Breuning (entomologist)
Insects of Uganda